Major-General John Pringle of Symington (1774–1861) was a 19th-century Scottish  soldier.

Life

He was born on New Year's Eve, 31 December 1774 at Carrington, Midlothian. His family were originally from Shetland. His father was Captain Robert Pringle, descended from Thomas Hoppringle of Symington (died 1684).

In 1812 he built Symington House, near Gala Water.

He lived his final years at 5 Mansionhouse Road (aka "Springfield Cottage") in the Grange district of south Edinburgh. He was a near neighbour to Major Alexander Skene.

He died on 29 December 1861, shortly before his 87th birthday. He is buried in Dean Cemetery on the west side of the city. The grave lies on the wall backing onto the first northern extension.

His house at Symington is now a listed building.

Family

In 1802, whilst a Captain, he was married to Christian Watson (1779–1854), daughter of Samuel Watson. They had at seven children. Initially after marriage they lived in Galway in Ireland.

His great uncle was Judge Robert Pringle of Charleston, South Carolina (1702–1776), father to John Julius Pringle.

References

1774 births
1861 deaths
People from Midlothian
Scottish landowners
British Army generals
Burials at the Dean Cemetery